This is a list of properties and districts in Sumter County, Georgia that are listed on the National Register of Historic Places (NRHP).

Current listings

|}

References

Sumter
Buildings and structures in Sumter County, Georgia